Tokyo Ghoul:re is the first season of the anime series adapted from the sequel manga of the same name by Sui Ishida, and is the third season overall within the Tokyo Ghoul anime series. The series is produced by Pierrot, and is directed by Odahiro Watanabe. The anime series aired from April 3 to June 19, 2018 on Tokyo MX, Sun TV, TVA, TVQ and BS11. This season adapts the first fifty-eight chapters of the manga.

Set two years after the ending of the original series, it follows the story of Haise Sasaki, Ken Kaneki's new identity, who is a member of the CCG and the leader of the Quinx Squad, a group of half-ghoul, half-human hybrids who use their ability to attack and defeat ghouls.

Yutaka Yamada returns as the composer for the score. The opening theme for the series is "Asphyxia" by Cö shu Nie, and the ending theme is "Half" by Queen Bee.

TC Entertainment released the series onto six volumes in Japan, with the first volume being released on June 27, 2018, and the final volume released on November 28, 2018.

Funimation licensed the series in North America, who simulcasted the series on FunimationNow and Hulu, produced an English dub as it aired, and released the series on home media on May 28, 2019. Madman Entertainment licensed the series in Australia and New Zealand, who simulcasted the series on AnimeLab. Anime Limited licensed the series in the United Kingdom and Ireland, who simulcasted the series on Crunchyroll.

Episode list

Home video release

References

External links
  

Tokyo Ghoul episode lists